The Palaeotype alphabet is a phonetic alphabet used by Alexander John Ellis to describe the pronunciation of English. It was based on the theory of Bell's Visible Speech, but set in roman script, and attempted to include the sounds conveyed by Lepsius's Standard Alphabet as well. It in turn inspired Henry Sweet's 1877 Romic alphabet, which itself served as the basis for the International Phonetic Alphabet.

It differs from previous phonetic alphabets, especially the English Phonotypic Alphabet of the same author, by maximal use of trivial changes to existing characters, including rotated letters (such as), small capitals (such as ), rotated small capitals, and italic rather than roman typeface (such as ).

Letters
The alphabet and its diacritics were quite similar to early versions of Sweet's Romic alphabet.

All letters could be capitalized.

(Parentheses) were used to set off phonetic transcription from regular text.

Vowels
 had basically the same values as in the IPA. Not all of the vowels seem to make sense when plotted on a modern chart, as below, either through jumbled graphic correspondence or according to the languages they were identified with, suggesting that the phonetic analysis was not sophisticated. Nevertheless, all vowels are identified in their placement in the table through sets of definitions that lock in place each of nine tetrads (such as the four close front vowels i · ɪ · 𝑖 · y).

 was used for the English reduced schwa, as the 'a' in 'real' or the 'o' in 'mention',  for the vowel of 'but'.

A turned apostrophe, essentially an ogonek, was used for nasal vowels, as in (a⸲) = IPA , but  for French nasal vowels (which phoneticists of this era described as having some sort of guttural quality), as in (aʌ) = IPA . A turned zero indicated a more-open articulation, (𝑤) indicated rounding, and a minus sign removed an element of articulation. E.g., (a0) is a more-open (a), (a𝑤) a rounded (a), (a−0) a less-open (a), and (o−𝑤) an unrounded (o).

(’) was "simple voice", as in (tabl’) for French table, or (𝑜𝑜p·’n) for English 'open'. (’h) was "a scarcely audible (ə)", and (’j) a "faint sound of (ᴊ, i)" as at the off-glide of the English vowel in see. When doubled, (’’) was used for Sanskrit ॠ (’’ʀ) and theoretical ॡ (’’l). (‘), bending in the opposite direction, meant voiceless, as in (‘a) = IPA .

Consonants
The h could come after a j or 𝑤, as in s𝑤h (defined as sh*wh).

 were used for IPA .

(lh) is a voiceless (l), but apparently not a lateral fricative, as Ellis renders Welsh 'll' as (lhh).

 was used for both the Spanish flap and English initial 'r'.  and 'palatal'  were used for English rhotic vowels, either as a coda if a distinct vowel could be heard, or alone for e.g. (sɹf) or (səɹf) 'surf' and (sɹf) or (səɹf) 'serf'.

A combining  made the aspirates  etc. (‘b, ‘d, ‘g), defined as (b*p) etc., are unvoiced unaspirated (p, t, k) -- specifically the Germanic consonants frequently written  in IPA. After a consonant,  seemed to have meant an aspirated release, e.g. English (b𝑖t‘) 'bit'.

Italic  were used for the 'emphatic' sounds of Arabic and similar languages. As noted below, 𝑏, 𝑝 were also used. 𝑝 might have been Lepsius's notation for the Quechua ejective p', in which case 𝑏 would have no explicit meaning.

Voicing transitions were apparently indicated by combining voiced and voiceless consonants. E.g. (zs) for the final /z/ in English days, buzz, (sz) for German initial s.

 (a turned digit 1) was used for the Semitic letter 'alif.

Modifications of consonants

A period / full stop was used for forceful pronunciation. E.g., (.f) was a "violently hissed (f)", and (.gh) a "violently buzzed [= voiced] (gh)". However, with other letters for alveolar consonants it was taken to mean 'advanced', with "the tip of the tongue on gums" (presumably dental, though that doesn't quite fit the second definition).

The right half of a dagger,  (that is,  with the left arm removed) indicated fronting (pronounced closer to the front of the mouth), and the left half, retraction (pronounced closer to the throat). A dagger indicated protrusion, as in interdental (t†). A turned dagger indicated retroflection, so (t⸸) was the same as (ᴛ). A double dagger indicated a click, so a fronted (t‡) was the same as (5), and (t⸸‡) the same as (↊).

 indicated bilateral airflow (off both sides of the tongue). Usually the bottom loop was filed off to indicate unilateral airflow.

 was combined with other letters to indicate they were trilled,  that it was ingressive.

Dubious consonants
In several cases, Ellis carried over letters or at least the sounds that they described from Lepsius's alphabet without knowing what they were supposed to be. That was the case for (𝑝), which he supposed might have been some sort of emphatic in Quechua, which indeed has an ejective p'. If that was the case, the voiced equivalent (𝑏) that he invented had no real meaning. There are other cases in which his notation is dubious.

(grh) was defined as (gh¿), a velar trill, which is not possible, and identified with the Semitic letter 'ayin, which elsewhere was given the value (↋). The voiceless analog, (krh) = (kh¿), is identified with Swiss German 'ch' and Arabic 'kh' and so perhaps they were uvular (and duplicates of (ᴋh · ɢh)).or something between those values.

(fh, vh) are defined as (f*kh, v*gh), which do not occur in human languages. The former, however, parallels the IPA's definition of their letter .

(ɴh) was defined as the sound Lespius said occurred before Dravidian (ᴅh), rather than voiceless (ɴ) as one might expect. However, Ellis listed no sound (ᴅh). He listed (ᴅhh), which he defined as "Lepsius's Dravidian sound, nearly (ᴅ𝑧h)", and so perhaps he intended ?(ɴhh) here. There is also voiceless (ᴛhh) for "Lepsius's Dravidian sound, nearly (ᴛ𝑠h)".

(ʜ‘) is defined as a "jerked whisper" and (ᴛ) a "lisped (l)" (with its voiceless partner ). The meanings of both are somewhat obscure.

(ʟ) was described as a "glottal Low German trill, nearly (↋)". There is an epiglottal trill, which is indeed close to 'ayin, but it does not occur in Low German.

(ʜ𝑤, ʜ𝑤h) were "a voiced whistle" and "an ordinary whistle, distinct from (wh, k𝑤h)". The meaning is unclear.

Stress, tone and prosody

 before a word indicated prosodic or contrastive stress. After a syllable it indicated lexical stress.

 after a syllable indicated secondary stress.

Tones were schematicized with periods and turned periods: (..) low tone, (··) high tone, (·.) falling tone, (.·) rising tone, (..·, ·..) -- the same, with longer time at low tone, (·.·) dipping tone, (.·.) peaking tone.

(؛ ,·؛.) were high and low checked tones.

Preceding a word, (·:·) and (.:.) meant to speak in high or low key.

(‘’) meant to speak the following in a "subdued" tone.

 modified an utterance. If the asterisks came between two symbols, they meant to replace the first with the second. For example,  before a phrase meant that all (l)s in that phrase were palatalized. Otherwise, the phonetic detail was to be applied to the entirety of the utterance. For example,  indicated that all the following was pronounced with a strained voice.

A hyphen indicated liaison, as in French (nuz- avoʌ) nous avons.

Notes

Bibliography 
 Alexander J. Ellis, On Early English pronunciation with especial reference to Shakspere and Chaucer, 5 volumes, Londres : The Philological Society, The Early English Text Society, et The Chaucer Society, 1869. (en ligne : volume 1, volume 2, volume 3, volume 4, volume 5)
 Michael Everson, Proposal to encode six punctuation characters in the UCS, December 5, 2009. (online)

Phonetic alphabets
English spelling reform
Writing systems introduced in the 1860s
British inventions